The 1949 National Invitation Tournament was the 1949 edition of the annual NCAA college basketball competition.

Selected teams
Below is a list of the 12 teams selected for the tournament.

 Bowling Green
 Bradley
 CCNY
 Kentucky
 Loyola (IL)
 Manhattan
 NYU
 St. John's
 Saint Louis
 San Francisco
 Utah
 Western Kentucky

Bracket
Below is the tournament bracket.

See also
 1949 NCAA basketball tournament
 1949 NAIA Basketball Tournament

References

National Invitation
National Invitation Tournament
1940s in Manhattan
Basketball in New York City
College sports in New York City
Madison Square Garden
National Invitation Tournament
National Invitation Tournament
Sports competitions in New York City
Sports in Manhattan